Tabory is a rural locality (a settlement) in Dobryansky District, Perm Krai, Russia. The population was 129 as of 2010. There are 11 streets.

Geography 
Tabory is located 57 km northeast of Dobryanka (the district's administrative centre) by road. Tabory (selo) is the nearest rural locality.

References 

Rural localities in Dobryansky District